This is a list of the villages in the Donetsk Oblast of Ukraine categorised by Raion.

Bakhmut Raion 

 Bakhmutske
 Berestove
 Berkhivka
 Bilohorivka
 Dronivka
 Hladosove
 Kodema
 Lozove
 Midna Ruda
 Nyzhnie Lozove
 Pokrovske
 Sakko I Vantsetti
 Serebrianka
 Shumy
 Spirne
 Vesela Dolyna

Donetsk Raion 

 Blahodatne
 Chervonosilske
 Dzerkalne
 Kruta Balka
 Kvashyne
 Spartak
 Ulianivske
 Vesele
 Yakovlivka

Horlivka Raion 

 Balka
 Dmytrivka
 Hirne
 Hrabove
 Kalynivka
 Kamianka
 Lohvynove
 Marynivka
 Mykhailivka
 Novohryhorivka
 Ozerianivka
 Riasne
 Sanzharivka
 Shyroka Balka
 Stavky
 Vesela Dolyna

Kalmiuske Raion 

 Azov
 Bezimenne
 Bila Kamianka
 Kreminets
 Nova Marivka
 Novolaspa
 Prymorske
 Sakhanka
 Slavne
 Starolaspa
 Styla
 Uzhivka
 Verkhnoshyrokivske
 Zelenyi Hai

Kramatorsk Raion 

 Bohorodychne
 Karpivka
 Katerynivka
 Kolodiazi
 Korovii Yar
 Krasnyi Kut
 Novooleksandrivka
 Oleksandrivka
 Ozerne
 Raiske
 Seleznivka
 Shandryholove
 Shchurove
 Staryi Karavan
 Terny
 Troitske
 Yatskivka
 Zelena Dolyna

Mariupol Raion 

 Chermalyk
 Hnutove
 Lebedynske
 Melekine
 Pavlopil
 Pikuzy
 Pokrovske
 Pyshchevyk
 Shyrokyne
 Vodiane
 Zaichenko
 Zoria

Pokrovsk Raion 

 Berdychi
 Halytsynivka
 Illinka
 Kamianka
 Karlivka
 Katerynivka
 Krasnohroivka
 Moskovske
 Nevelske
 Novomykhailivka
 Novoselivka Druha
 Novoselivka
 Opytne
 Pisky
 Sontsivka
 Suvorove
 Tonenke
 Troitske
 Vasylivka
 Vovkove

Volnovakha Raion 

 Berezove
 Bohdanivka
 Hranitne
 Kamianka
 Mykolaivka
 Novohnativka
 Novomaiorske
 Novosilka
 Pavlivka
 Petrivka
 Solodke
 Starohnativka
 Staromarivka
 Staromlynivka
 Taramchuk
 Trudivske
 Zachativka
 Zatyshne
 Zelene Pole
 Zelenyi Hai, Komar rural hromada
 Zelenyi Hai, Volnovakha urban hromada

Villages in Donetsk Oblast
Donetsk
Donetsk Oblast